Parnassius imperator is a high-altitude butterfly which is found in western China and north-east India. It is a member of the generally white, high-elevation genus Parnassius, known as snow Apollos, of the family Papilionidae, known as swallowtails (although they lack tails).

It has over 40 subspecies, including the critically endangered Himalayan species P. i. augustus, commonly known as the imperial Apollo. Apollo Augustus, the imperial Apollo, appeared on Roman coins of the second century CE.

When P. imperator comes to rest, its wings spread horizontally so that its body lies close to the ground, lessening attacks by strong winds.

Description
Subspecies P. i. augustus was described by Hans Fruhstorfer in the 1907 book The Fauna of British India, Including Ceylon and Burma – Butterflies, Volume II:

Range
“North-eastern India (Sikkim), western China (Xizang Zizhiqu (Tibet), Qinghai, Gansu, Sichuan (Szechwan) and Yunnan).” One early siting in Tibet was by Antwerp Edgar Pratt, "... I returned to Ta-tsien-lu... I found time to search for the larvae of Parnassius Imperator and got about twenty, and one pupa"

Status
P. imperator is "not known to be threatened as a species, but P. i. augustus is protected by law in India. It seems to be a common subalpine species in China." P. i. augustus was also included as a Schedule I subspecies in the Wildlife Protection Act, 1972. P. i. augustus was listed as "critically endangered" in the 1994 The Red Data Book on Indian Animals: Butterflies of India. P. imperator has been said to command a high price at European butterfly auctions in the past.

Subspecies
There were twenty subspecies in 1985, and more than twice that now included in the Global Names Index:

 P. i. acalanatha Shinkai & Morita, 1995
 P. i. aino Bryk, 1932
 P. i. augustus Fruhstorfer, 1903
 P. i. aungsani Nose & Mikami, 1998
 P. i. cedermarki Bryk, 1934
 P. i. dominus Bang-Haas, 1934
 P. i. erlaensis Sugiyama, 1992
 P. i. evansi Bryk, 1932
 P. i. gigas Kotzsch, 1932
 P. i. haveli Kocman, 1995
 P. i. hoshinoi Kocman, 1999
 P. i. imperator Oberthür, 1883
 P. i. imperatrix Alph. 1897
 P. i. imposantus Schulte, 1991
 P. i. indra Korb 1997 - disputed validity
 P. i. interjungens Bryk 1932
 P. i. intermedius Rothschild 1909
 P. i. irmae Bryk, 1932
 P. i. jiyetiani Pierrat, 1990
 P. i. kameii Furumi & Sinkai, 1992
 P. i. karmapa Weiss & Michel, 1989
 P. i. kawasakii Sorimachi, 1992
 P. i. luxuriosus Mrácek & Schulte, 1990
 P. i. mahamayuri Shinkai & Morita, 1995
 P. i. milarepa Hamada, 2003
 P. i. musetta Bryk & Eisner, 1932
 P. i. musageta Grum-Grshimailo, 1891
 P. i. namchawarwanus Watanabe, 1995
 P. i. quaidami Kocman, 1995
 P. i. regina Bryk & Eisner, 1932
 P. i. regulus Bryk & Eisner, 1932
 P. i. rex Bang-Haas, 1928
 P. i. soi Sorimachi, 1997
 P. i. sultan Bryk & Eisner, 1932
 P. i. supremus Fruhstorfer, 1903
 P. i. takashii Ohya, 1990
 P. i. tara Shinkai, 1997
 P. i. titus Kocman, 1997
 P. i. tyrannus Bang-Haas, 1935
 P. i. uxoria Bang-Haas, 1935
 P. i. uxorius Bang-Haas, 1935
 P. i. vajramusti Oikawa, 1995
 P. i. venustus Stichel, 1906

Cited references

See also
Papilionidae
List of butterflies of India
List of butterflies of India (Papilionidae)

Further reading
sv:Parnassius imperator - Swedish Wikipedia provides further references and synonymy

imperator
Butterflies described in 1883